Cat5 or CAT5 may refer to:

Category 5 hurricane, used in the Saffir–Simpson Hurricane Scale
Category 5 cable, unshielded twisted pair type cable
Port McNeill Airport, the ICAO airport code (CAT5)
 LTE User Equipment Category 5